Joe Allison is a former American football placekicker. Allison is perhaps most famous for being the winner of the inaugural Lou Groza Award in 1992, the award presented to honor the top placekicker in college football. He went on to play in one game for the Memphis Mad Dogs of the Canadian Football League in 1995.

Career

High school
Allison attended high school at American High School in Miami, Florida. Although he starred at his school as a quarterback, punter, and placekicker, Memphis State University was the only Division I-A school to offer him a scholarship. Allison chose to accept the scholarship and attend Memphis State.

College
Allison played collegiate football at the University of Memphis, which at the time was called Memphis State University. In 1992, his junior season at the school, Allison won the Lou Groza Award, awarded to the nation's top placekicker. During the season, Allison made 23 out of 25 field goals, and led the NCAA in both field goals made as well as field goal percentage, where he achieved 92 percent. He also connected on all 32 extra points that he attempted. For the 1992 season, Allison scored a total of 101 points. Allison was also named by the Associated Press to the first-team All-American team, the first Memphis State University player in the school's history to be honored with that recognition.

Professional
Allison played a single regular season game for the Memphis Mad Dogs of the Canadian Football League, in which he completed six kick-offs, scored one field goal on three attempts, and made two singles.

Personal life
Joe Allison's first cousin was Davey Allison, who was a NASCAR race car driver for Robert Yates Racing. Davey was killed in a helicopter accident in 1993. Joe was the godfather to Davey's daughter Krista. Joe and Davey were very close, and after his death, Joe said "Before I go in to kick, I put my hat down and say, 'Davey, give me the strength to do the best I can, to be as strong as you were.'"
Joe is currently a special education teacher at Harmony High School in Harmony, Florida and is a husband and the father of three young men.

References

1970 births
Living people
All-American college football players
American football placekickers
Memphis Tigers football players
Memphis Mad Dogs players
Canadian football placekickers
American players of Canadian football
Players of American football from Miami